Sarmaj-e Karami (also Romanized as Sarmāj-e Karamī; also known as Sarmāj and Sarmāj-e Keranū) is a village in Shirez Rural District, Bisotun District, Harsin County, Kermanshah Province, Iran. At the 2006 census, its population was 56, in 10 families.

References 

Populated places in Harsin County